Gould is an unincorporated community in Jefferson County, in the U.S. state of Ohio.

History
A post office called Gould was established in 1881, and was discontinued in 1884. Besides the post office, Gould had a railroad depot called Gould's Station.

References

Unincorporated communities in Jefferson County, Ohio
Unincorporated communities in Ohio